Abdolhamid Rigi (also spelt Abdul-hamid Rigi or Abdulhamid Rigi) (c. 1979 – May 24, 2010) was the elder brother of the detained leader of Jundallah, Abdolmalek Rigi. Like his brother, he was a member of the militant Sunni Islamist organization, which is widely recognized as a terrorist group, including by Iran and four other countries.

He was executed by hanging in prison on May 24, 2010.

Detention
Rigi was arrested by Pakistani forces and transferred to Iranian officials in 2008 with 13 other militants. He was tried through the Iranian judiciary system, and was convicted of membership in the terrorist group, Jundallah (God's Soldiers); insurgency; smuggling; participating in the bombing and killing of civilians and police, including the Revolutionary Guards; as well as being mohareb (at war with God). He was sentenced to death through capital punishment.

Death sentence
Rigi was supposed to have been executed in 2009 with others, but was only executed on May 24, 2010, by hanging in Zahedan's jail in front of his victims' relatives.

After the execution, his parents-in-law were interviewed. They said Rigi was a "brutal criminal". They also asked for the cooperation of Pakistan to return his children to Iran.

Film about his life
An Iranian drama film written and directed by Narges Abyar in 2019, which was awarded in the Fajr International Film Festival, pays tribute to AbdolHamid Rigi and his wife story. The film name is When the Moon Was Full and is based on the true story of the brother and sister-in-law of Abdolmalek Rigi, the leader of the Jundallah terrorist group in Iran's southeastern province of Sistan and Baluchestan.

See also

 2009 Zahedan explosion
 When the Moon Was Full

References

External links
Did The U.S. Have Contact with Terror Group That Attacked Iran?

Terrorism in Iran
Terrorism in Pakistan
Iranian Sunni Muslims
Baloch politicians
Sunni Islamists
Iranian murderers
1979 births
2010 deaths
People executed by Iran by hanging
Executed Iranian people
21st-century executions by Iran
Jundallah (Iran)
Iranian rebels
People from Zahedan